RDM may stand for:

In business:
 Rheinmetall Denel Munition, Military technology group - Germany.
 Rheinmetall Denel Munition South Africa, Military technology group - South Africa.
 Rotterdamsche Droogdok Maatschappij, a shipbuilding and repair company in Rotterdam, the Netherlands
 Robust decision-making, a framework that helps identify and evaluate robust strategies under 'deep uncertainty'

In military:
 Radar Doppler Multifunction, a French stopgap radar for the Mirage 2000 fighter plane
 Radarman, a former rank of the United States Navy

In music:
 Rhythms del Mundo, a nonprofit salsa and mambo album by Cuban musicians
 Il Rovescio della Medaglia, an Italian symphonic rock band

In people:
 Robert Douglas McIntyre (1913-1998), Scottish nationalist politician
 Roberto Di Matteo (born 1970), Italian football player
 Ronald D. Moore (born 1964), American screenwriter and TV producer of Star Trek and Battlestar Galactica
 Roy D. Mercer, a prank-calling radio character
 Raphael Maklouf, British sculptor and designer of the third coinage portrait of Elizabeth II, sometimes known by his initials RDM

In technology:
 Rapid Development Methodology, software Iterative and incremental development process, developed by Lynn G. Gref and Dr. William Spuck
 Raw Disk Mapping, hard disk mapping for use by a virtual disk image
 RDM Server, a database platform from Raima Inc
 Red Digital Magazines, components of the REDCODE file format
 RDM (lighting), or Remote Device Management, an electronic protocol used in stage lighting
 Research data management, the organisation of research data, from its entry to the research cycle through to the dissemination and archiving of results
 Reference Data Management, the data used to categorize other data within applications and databases

In transportation:
 Riding Mill railway station (National Rail station code), Northumberland, England
 Roberts Field (IATA airport code), an airport in Redmond, Oregon

Other
 Red Dragon Movement, a now defunct Welsh nationalist organization
 Red Mage, a character class from the Dungeons & Dragons and Final Fantasy games
 Reduced density matrix, in the Contracted Schrödinger Equation method for finding the electronic structure of molecules
 , the Romanian acronym for the Moldavian Democratic Republic
 Random Deathmatch, a term used on Garry's Mod roleplay servers.